Phyllozoon(lit. "Leaf animal" in greek) is an Ediacaran imprint that resembles a proarticulatan and has been interpreted as a feeding trace.  It usually occurs in long chains of imprints formed, presumably as the organism that made it moved.

See also
List of Ediacaran genera

References

Fossils of Australia
Dipleurozoa
Ediacaran life
Fossil taxa described in 1978
Trace fossils